Ascidiella aspersa (European sea squirt) is a species of solitary sea squirts native to the northeastern Atlantic, from the Mediterranean Sea to Norway. Their branchial (or oral) siphons are conical and positioned at the top of the body. They possess six to eight lobes. The atrial siphons are located at the upper third of the side of the body and possess six lobes. The body is covered by a firm transparent test that is greyish to brown in color. The test often snag detritus that remain loosely attached to the animal. When expanded, at most 40 tentacles can be observed on the inside surface of the branchial wall. Both the openings of the branchial and atrial siphons possess lighter colored ridges on their rims. They may also be frilled at times. A. aspersa are attached to the substrates by the left side of their bodies.

A. aspersa closely resemble Ciona intestinalis, but can be distinguished by their lack of yellow markings around their siphons.

References 

Enterogona
Animals described in 1776
Taxa named by Otto Friedrich Müller